Dorothy Edwards Brunson (March 13, 1939 – July 31, 2011) was a notable African-American broadcaster.

Between 1973 and 1979, Brunson was an executive with Inner City Broadcasting Corporation, which owned WLIB and WBLS in New York City.

After leaving Inner City Broadcasting, Brunson was the first African-American female to own a radio station, WEBB (1360 AM) in Baltimore, Maryland, purchased from entertainer James Brown in 1979. She also later purchased radio stations in Atlanta and Wilmington, North Carolina.

Brunson would sell off her radio stations eleven years later in 1990 to provide funding to establish WGTW-TV (Channel 48), licensed to Burlington, New Jersey, a suburb of Philadelphia, to the east across the Delaware River, becoming the first African-American woman to establish a television station. She later sold WGTW-TV to the Trinity Broadcasting Network in 2004, as the station was experiencing additional hardships with limited financial resources in acquiring additional quality syndicated programming.

Death
Brunson succumbed to ovarian cancer at Mercy Medical Center in Baltimore on July 31, 2011, at age 72.

References

External links
Dorothy Brunson v. Kalil & Company, Incorporated and Brunson Communications, Incorporated (PDF)

1939 births
2011 deaths
American radio personalities
African-American businesspeople
American businesspeople
Deaths from ovarian cancer
Deaths from cancer in Maryland
20th-century African-American people
21st-century African-American people